Enrique Pinder (born August 7, 1947) is a Panamanian former professional boxer who competed from 1966 until 1973. He held the undisputed WBA, WBC, and The Ring bantamweight titles from 1972 to 1973.

Professional career
In 1966, Pinder began his professional career successfully. In late July 1972, he boxed against Rafael Herrera for the Lineal, WBC and WBA  Bantamweight championships and won by unanimous judges' decision. He lost his world titles in his first defense in January of the following year to Romeo Anaya of Mexico by knockout. After suffering back-to-back defeats in the same year, Pinder ended his career with a record of 35 wins with 13 knockouts, 7 defeats and 2 draws.

See also
List of bantamweight boxing champions
List of WBA world champions
List of WBC world champions
List of The Ring world champions

References

External links

Enrique Pinder - The Cyber Boxing Zone Encyclopedia

|-

|-

|-

1947 births
People from Panama City
Bantamweight boxers
World Boxing Association champions
World Boxing Council champions
Panamanian aviators
Panamanian male boxers
Living people